Maharajpur Assembly constituency is one of the 230 Vidhan Sabha (Legislative Assembly) constituencies of Madhya Pradesh state in central India. This constituency came into existence in 1961, following the delimitation of the Legislative Assembly constituencies and it was reserved for the candidates belonging to the scheduled castes from 1961 to 2008.

Overview
Maharajpur (constituency number 48) is one of the 6 Vidhan Sabha constituencies located in Chhatarpur district. This constituency covers the entire Nowgaon tehsil of the district.

Maharajpur is part of Tikamgarh Lok Sabha constituency along with seven other Vidhan Sabha segments, namely, Chhatarpur and Bijawar in this district and Jatara, Prithvipur, Niwari, Tikamgarh and Khargapur in Tikamgarh district.

Members of Legislative Assembly
 1962: Nathoo Ram, Bharatiya Jana Sangh
 1967: Laxman Das Ahirwar, Indian National Congress
 1972: Nathoo Ram, Bharatiya Jana Sangh
 1977: Ramdayal Ahirwar, Janata Party
 1980: Laxman Das Ahirwar, Indian National Congress
 1985: Baboolal Ahirwar, Indian National Congress
 1990: Ramdayal Ahirwar, Bharatiya Janata Party
 1993: Ramdayal Ahirwar, Bharatiya Janata Party
 1998: Ramdayal Ahirwar, Bharatiya Janata Party
 2003: Ramdayal Ahirwar, Bharatiya Janata Party
 2008: Manavendra Singh (Bhanwar Raja), Independent 
 2013: Manavendra Singh (Bhanwar Raja), Bharatiya Janata Party

See also
 Maharajpur
 Nowgaon

References

Chhatarpur district
Assembly constituencies of Madhya Pradesh